National Immigration Administration (NIA), also known as the Exit and Entry Administration of the People's Republic of China for regional border control between Mainland China and Hong Kong, Macau, or Taiwan Area, is a sub-ministry level executive agency administrated by the Ministry of Public Security (MPS). The administration is responsible for coordinating and formulating immigration policies and their implementation, border control, administering foreigners’ stay, management on refugees and nationality, taking the lead in coordinating the administering of foreigners who illegally enter, stay or are employed in China, and the repatriation of illegal immigrants.

The agency was formed to focus on the management of illegal entry, illegal residence, illegal employment" of foreigners (referred to as "Three-Non Foreigners") in addition to being responsible for the management of Chinese citizens entering and leaving the country (border) for private purposes.

History 
Prior to 2018, the Exit-Entry Administration of the Ministry of Public Security (known as the Sixth Bureau of the Ministry of Public Security), was in charge of public security entry-exit management. The public security departments and bureaus of provinces, autonomous regions, and municipalities directly under the Central Government had set up entry-exit administrations (divisions) responsible for the entry and exit administration of public security in their respective regions; most prefectures and cities and county-level public security agencies had heavy workloads and tasks. A special agency for entry and exit management was required to specifically perform various tasks for entry and exit management. The entry-exit administrative departments of the local public security organs at all levels accept the guidance of the entry-exit administrative departments of the higher-level public security organs, and at the same time accept the leadership of the public security organs at the same level.

The former border defense force of the public security was an important armed law enforcement force deployed by the state in coastal areas and ports. It was subordinate to the Border Defense Administration of the Ministry of Public Security and implemented an active-duty armed police system. The border defense force was responsible for public security frontier defense corps in provinces, autonomous regions, and municipalities directly under the Central Government, public security frontier defense detachments in borders and coastal areas (cities, prefectures, leagues), public security frontier defense squads in counties (cities, banners), and border defenses in towns along the border and coastal areas. The administration was also responsible for police stations set up on border security checkpoints on the main arterial roads leading to the border management areas in the inland, maritime police detachments and brigades in coastal areas and border checkpoints at open ports. As of 2018, there were 1845 border police stations nationwide.

In July 1998, 9 cities including Beijing, Tianjin, Shanghai, Guangzhou, Shenzhen, Zhuhai, Xiamen, Haikou, and Shantou established the entry-exit border checkpoints, which were vertically led by the Ministry of Public Security. In 2011, according to the Central Office document on the "approval on the adjustment of Beijing in seven vocational institutions specifications preparing Frontier Guard Inspection Station" (Central Office Document No. 54), Shenzhen FGIS and seven other professional Frontier Inspection Station Specifications adjusted from the deputy department level to the main department level with the institutional affiliation and staffing remaining unchanged.

On March 17, 2018, the first meeting of the 13th National People's Congress passed the "Decision on the State Council Institutional Reform Program at the First Meeting of the Thirteenth National People's Congress" and approved the "State Council Institutional Reform Program." The plan stipulated the establish a National Immigration Administration (NIA) and integrating the immigration management and border inspection duties of the Ministry of Public Security, establishing a sound visa management coordination mechanism and the setting up of a National Immigration Administration under the sign of the Exit-Entry Administration of the People's Republic of China of the Ministry of Public Security

On April 2, 2018, the National Immigration Administration was officially established. On December 25, 2018, the officers and soldiers of the active public security forces officially retired from active service. On January 1, 2019, the public security frontier guards held a collective renewal ceremony and were officially transferred to the people's police.

In this institutional reform, the former public security frontier guards’ provincial corps were transferred and collectively retired from active service, and the provinces (regions) entry-exit border inspection stations were adjusted and established. Among them, Inner Mongolia, Liaoning, Jilin, Heilongjiang, Guangxi, Yunnan, Tibet and nine border provinces (regions) including Gansu, Xinjiang, etc. border entry-exit and border inspection stations were merged with the border management team of the public security department. The border management team has several front-level border management detachments under the vertical management of the national immigration administration. The Shantou General Border Inspection Station was abolished, and the subordinate units were included in the Shenzhen General Border Inspection Station. In this reform, the original nine border police stations in border provinces and autonomous regions were changed to border police stations, led by the territorial border management detachment (or brigade), belonging to the National Immigration Administration, and included in the central fiscal budget unit sequence. The original border police stations in coastal provinces were changed to local police stations, which were managed by the local public security sub-bureaus, belonged to the local public security systems, and were included in the sequence of local fiscal budget units. In addition, on the basis of training management forces of the Border Defense Administration of the Ministry of Public Security, the first team of the National Immigration Administration Standing Force (Party School of the National Immigration Administration) was established. Road; Based on the establishment of the Non-commissioned Officer School of the Public Security Border Forces, the second corps of the Standing Force of the National Immigration Administration (National Immigration Administration Education and Training Network College) was established. The team is located at No. 705 Yunda West Road, Guandu District, Kunming City, Yunnan Province.

After the reform, the National Immigration Administration led the management of 33 entry-exit border inspection stations and 2 standing force teams. The national immigration management system has 285 entry-exit border checkpoints and 46 border management detachments . At the same time, the National Immigration Administration in the name of the Exit-Entry Administration of the People's Republic of China instructed 31 provinces including municipalities directly under the Central Government and autonomous regions public security bureaus (bureaus) to subordinate to the exit and entry administrations (divisions) of their areas respectively.

On June 1, 2019, in accordance with institutional reform, the names of the issuing authorities for the current entry and exit documents issued within the territory of the People's Republic of China have were changed. Among them, the entry and exit documents of mainland Chinese residents and the entry, stay, residence, permanent residence and other documents of foreigners will be issued under the name of the National Immigration Administration of the People's Republic of China; entry and exit documents for Chinese citizens to and from Hong Kong, Macao and Taiwan will be subject to the entry and exit administration of the People's Republic of China Issued under the name of public security bureaus. All types of entry-exit documents issued by the Exit-Entry Administration of the Ministry of Public Security can continue to be used during the validity period of the documents .

On September 3, 2019, the National Immigration Administration held a working meeting of the preparatory group for the National Immigration Administration Repatriation Center, and announced the establishment of the National Immigration Administration repatriation (deportation) Centers in Langfang, Jiutai, Huangpi, Huadu, Dongxing, Ruili, and Xinshi.

On April 1, 2021, with the approval of the Central Committee of the Chinese Communist Party, the National Immigration Management Agency will use its own flag and logo from April 2, 2021, onwards.

Leadership

Reforms
From 1 April 2019 onwards, all mainland citizens can apply and receive passports and exit and entry permits from the NIA offices anywhere in the country, instead of requiring citizens to go to their Hukou city/province to apply. Also, exit and entry permits to Hong Kong, Macau and Taiwan can be applied to, received, and delivered within a few minutes on automatic machines.

References

External links 
 

State Council of the People's Republic of China
Government agencies of China
Immigration services
Immigration to China
China